Balak Singh (1784/1785/1797–1862), was an Indian Sikh religious leader who founded the Namdhari (Kuka) sect. He was a Batra Arora, who invoked the authority of Sikh scriptures and emphasized the importance of the name (nam) for salvation. Namdhari Sikhs believe he was the successor of Guru Gobind Singh, a stance that differs them from mainstream Sikhism. Namdharis believe Guru Gobind Singh lived to the ripe-old age of 146 when he died in the year 1812, long enough to be contemporary with Balak Singh and pass on the Guruship to him.

Gallery

References

External links
Sri   Guru Balak Singh Ji - Patshahi 11
https://web.archive.org/web/20060510111130/http://www.sikh-history.com/sikhhist/events/namdhari.html

1797 births
1862 deaths
Indian Sikh religious leaders